John Milton Holley (November 10, 1802 – March 8, 1848) was a U.S. Representative from New York.

Born in Salisbury, Connecticut, Holley was graduated from Yale College in 1822.
He studied law.
He was admitted to the bar and commenced practice in Black Rock, New York, in 1825.
He moved to Lyons, New York, in 1826 and continued the practice of law.
He was a member of the New York State Assembly (Wayne Co.) in 1838 and 1841.
He served as district attorney of Wayne County 1842–1845.
He was an unsuccessful candidate for election in 1844 to the Twenty-ninth Congress.

Holley was elected as a Whig to the Thirtieth Congress and served from March 4, 1847, until his death in Jacksonville, Florida, March 8, 1848.
He was interred in the Rural Cemetery, Lyons, New York.

See also
List of United States Congress members who died in office (1790–1899)

Sources

1802 births
1848 deaths
Yale College alumni
Members of the New York State Assembly
Whig Party members of the United States House of Representatives from New York (state)
People from Salisbury, Connecticut
People from Lyons, New York
19th-century American politicians
Wayne County District Attorneys